Arjen Kamphuis (Groningen, 26 January 1972 – missing since 20 August 2018, last seen in Bodø, Norway) was a cybersecurity expert and hacktivist. He addressed topics like open standards and free software, safe elections and an IT-aware and IT-capable government, eventually to protect free speech and democracy. Ever since Edward Snowden leaked highly classified information from the National Security Agency (NSA) in 2013, he was especially dedicated to protecting investigative journalists. He wrote the book ‘Information security for investigative journalists’ with co-author Silkie Carlo, director of Big Brother Watch.

Career
Kamphuis was co-founder and Chief Technology Officer of Gendo. Kamphuis studied Natural Sciences at Utrecht University and worked for IBM and Twynstra Gudde as IT architect, trainer and IT strategy advisor. He was a certified EDP auditor and information security specialist. Since 2006 he helped to secure the information systems of corporates, national government and NGO's. His work ranges from regular privacy-compliance and security-awareness up to countering espionage against companies, journalists and governments. To keep up technically he was involved with the global hacker-scene. He kept in touch with (former)employees of spy agencies and other professionals who work at the front of critical infrastructure protection. He worked on the strategic impact of new technological developments and the social, economic and geo-political impact of science and technology.

In 2016 Kamphuis started working for Brunel in Amsterdam as Lead Advisor Information Security and from then on he worked closely with William (Bill) Binney and Kirk Wiebe. On 11 August 2017, he was invited with Bill Binney to a press conference in Austria, together with Max Schrems and Thomas Lohninger to talk about mass surveillance in Austria. In late 2017 he started the Brunel daughter company Pretty Good Knowledge as Technical Director. Bill Binney and Kirk Wiebe were co-founders and they contribute as Directors of Analytics.

Kamphuis has been involved in formulating public IT policy in the areas of open standards and open source for the government and public sector. He advised senior managers and administrators of companies and public institutions, members of parliament in several European countries and the Dutch Cabinet about the opportunities offered by open standards and open source software for the European knowledge economy and society as a whole. In the expert team of Plasterk he advised about (not) using e-voting for elections.

Personal life
Kamphuis was in a relationship with Annie Machon, former MI5 intelligence officer and whistleblower, between 2007 and 2014, living in Düsseldorf and Berlin. In 2016 he settled in Amsterdam. He was a much sought-after international speaker on technology policy issues. He wrote about his insights and ideas for Huffington Post.

Disappearance
The Norwegian police conclude that Kamphuis probably drowned due to a kayaking incident on the fjord near Rognan, Norway. His body has not been found. After his disappearance, friends of Kamphuis compiled a book of a selection of his articles to which prof. dr. B.P.F. (Bart) Jacobs, Professor Interdisciplinary Hub for Security, Privacy and Data Governance at Radboud University Nijmegen in the Netherlands wrote the introduction Arjen Kamphuis and the public cause in the digital world.

Bibliography
Kamphuis, A. (2020). Infosecurity (Gran knows why). Gendo; ISBN  9789090328218 -

See also
List of people who disappeared

References

1972 births
2010s missing person cases
Hacktivists
Living people
Missing person cases in Norway